Jochem Kahl (born 1961) is a German Egyptologist. 

A native of Ravensburg, Kahl studied undergraduate history and Greek at the University of Tübingen from 1983 to 1984 and then Egyptology, Classical Archeology and Pre- and Early History at Münster, Tübingen and Vienna between 1984 and 1990. Kahl undertook his doctorate with the study "The System of Egyptian Hieroglyphic Writing in the 0th - 3rd Dynasty" between 1992 to 1998.

From 1998 to 2004 he was a university lecturer at the Institute for Egyptology and Coptology at the University of Münster. 
In 2004 he was given a professorship at the University of Münster and in 2006 a professorship at University of Mainz.
He is currently at Free University of Berlin.

He leads the excavations at Assiut and the surrounding area in Central Egypt and has been a professor at the Free University of Berlin since October 2008.  Kahl is a member of the German Archaeological Institute.

Selected publications 
 The system of Egyptian hieroglyphic writing in the 0th to 3rd centuries Dynasty , Harrassowitz, Wiesbaden, 1994.
  with Nicole Kloth, Ursula Zimmermann: The Inscriptions of the 3rd Dynasty.  An inventory , Harrassowitz, Wiesbaden, 1995  (= Egyptological Treatises , Volume 56). 
  Steh auf, gib Horus deine Hand.  The narrative of Altenmüller's pyramid text saying , Harrassowitz, Wiesbaden, 1996
  Siut - Thebes.  To appreciate tradition in ancient Egypt , Leiden, Brill 1999 
  with Eva-Maria Engel: buried, burned, misunderstood and forgotten - finds from the "Menesgrab" , Münster 2001 
  Searching for the Rise of the Sun God at the Dawn of Egyptian History .  (= Menes , Volume 1) Harrassowitz, Wiesbaden, 2007
  Ancient Asyut.  The First Synthesis after 300 Years of Research.  (= The Asyut Project , Volume 1) Harrassowitz, Wiesbaden, 2007 
  Die Zeit selbst lag nun tot darnieder.  The city of Assiut and its necropolises according to western travel reports from the 17th to 19th centuries: construction, destruction and reconstruction.  (= The Asyut Project , Volume 5) Harrassowitz, Wiesbaden 2013,  . 
  The Tomb of the Dogs at Asyut: Faunal Remains and Other Selected Objects. With contributions by Jochem Kahl and Günter Vittmann The Tomb of the Dogs at Asyut: Faunal Remains and Other Selected Objects. With contributions by Jochem Kahl and Günter Vittmann (The Asyut Project, Band 9).</ref>
The Asyut Project: Eleventh Season of Fieldwork (2014) [Painted pottery from the so-called “Hogarth Depot“ in Tomb IV of the Asyut necropolisThe Asyut Project: Eleventh Season of Fieldwork (2014) [Painted pottery from the so-called “Hogarth Depot“ in Tomb IV of the Asyut necropolis.</ref>
 Ein wiederentdeckter Hundefriedhof in Assiut, 2010.
The Asyut Project: six seasons of fieldwork 2009
The Asyut Project: Fourth Season of Fieldwork (2006)
The First Intermediate Period Tombs at Asyut Revisited

References 

Academic staff of Johannes Gutenberg University Mainz
Living people
German expatriates in Austria
University of Vienna alumni
University of Münster alumni
Academic staff of the University of Münster
University of Tübingen alumni
Academic staff of the Free University of Berlin
German Egyptologists
People from Ravensburg
21st-century archaeologists
20th-century German male writers
21st-century German male writers
20th-century archaeologists
1961 births
Academic journal editors
Archaeologists from Baden-Württemberg